Ding Feng (born March 19, 1987) is a Chinese sport shooter. He won a bronze medal at the 2012 Summer Olympics in the 25 metre rapid fire pistol.

References

External links
 

1987 births
Olympic shooters of China
Chinese male sport shooters
Shooters at the 2012 Summer Olympics
Living people
Olympic bronze medalists for China
Olympic medalists in shooting
Sport shooters from Jiangsu
Sportspeople from Changzhou
Asian Games medalists in shooting
Medalists at the 2012 Summer Olympics
Shooters at the 2010 Asian Games
Shooters at the 2014 Asian Games
Universiade medalists in shooting
Asian Games gold medalists for China
Medalists at the 2010 Asian Games
Medalists at the 2014 Asian Games
Universiade gold medalists for China
Medalists at the 2011 Summer Universiade
Medalists at the 2013 Summer Universiade
21st-century Chinese people